Judy Petty Wolf (born September 4, 1943) is an American politician who served in the Arkansas House of Representatives.

Her husband Dr. Robert Wolf died on April 15, 2018 at the age of 76.

References

The New York Times, September 8, 1974.
Arkansas Gazette, November 1, 1974.
Arkansas Gazette, October 5, 1982.
Arkansas Gazette, November 1–3, 1974; October 5, 27, 1982.
The New York Times, September 8, 1974.
Jack Bass and Walter DeVries, The Transformation of Southern Politics: Social Change and Political Consequences Since 1945 (New York, 1976), p. 99
Marshall Frady, Southerners (New York, 1980), p. 116
Face the Nation, CBS, June 4, 1972, p. 184.
Congressional Quarterly Weekly Report, October 12, 1974, p. 2,720.
Election Statistics, 1974, 1984 (Little Rock: Secretary of State).

External links
Staff listing, The News, UTHSCSA
"June 28 retirement ceremony to honor the Wolfs", June 27, 2006
"Senate committee action report", March 24, 1999

1943 births
Living people
Businesspeople from Little Rock, Arkansas
Politicians from Little Rock, Arkansas
University of Arkansas at Little Rock alumni
Republican Party members of the Arkansas House of Representatives
Women state legislators in Arkansas
21st-century American women